Qila Gujar Singh (Fort of Gujjar Singh) is a town located in the central part of Lahore, Pakistan. It is the site of the fort of the 18th-century Gurjar king Gujjar Singh Banghi, and the fort's walls and a gate still remain. The area is now local property. There is a busy market in the streets of Qila Gujar Singh. It is surrounded by Police Lines Road, the Lahore Hotel, a TV station, and a radio station.

References

Data Gunj Bakhsh Zone
History of Lahore